The following is the official canvassing of votes by the Congress of the Philippines for the 1992 Philippine presidential and vice presidential election. The canvassing started on May 26, 1992 and finished on June 16, 1992.

Process
After voters had finished voting, the board of election inspectors per precinct then count the votes received by each candidate in each position. For positions elected on a national basis (president, vice president, and senators), an election return for that precinct will be submitted to the municipal/city board of canvassers, Congress, Commission on Elections, the citizen's arm authorized by the commission, political parties, and others.

The city or municipality will then tally the votes in the election returns for all positions and will issue two documents at its conclusion: a statement of votes where the votes obtained by candidates in each precinct in a city/municipality is stated; and a certificate of canvass (COC), a document containing the total votes in figures obtained by each candidate in the city or municipality. The city or municipal COC will be sent to Congress (if the city is an Independent city with its own legislative district) or to the provincial board of canvassers in which the process is repeated; this time the provincial COC will be sent to Congress.

Congress, seating as the National Board of Canvassers, will canvass the votes to determine who among the candidates are elected president and vice president.

In theory, all of the votes from the election returns when added must be equal to the votes canvassed by Congress coming from the city/provincial COCs.

Members of the canvassing committee
Instead of the whole Congress canvassing the votes, a committee comprised evenly between the Senate and the House of Representatives will canvass the votes at the Batasang Pambansa Complex in Quezon City, the home of the House of Representatives.

Members of Congress who ran for president (Ramon Mitra, Miriam Defensor Santiago, Jovito Salonga) and vice president (Aquilino Pimentel Jr., Joseph Estrada) are banned from attending the proceedings.

Each political party is entitled to two lawyers who may file motions before Congress.

Presidential election

Vice presidential election

References

1992 in politics
1992 elections in the Philippines